Samir Masimov (born 25 August 1995) is an Azerbaijani footballer playing as a winger for Russian club Khimki. He also holds Russian citizenship as Samir Ibragim-ogly Masimov.

Club career
Born in Baku, Azerbaijan, Masimov was a product of the Lokomotiv Moscow II youth system, by becoming one of the talented players in country.

Samir Masimov signed a five-year contract with Neftchi Baku on 23 January 2014. He became a regular first team player at Neftchi Baku during 2013–14 season Europa League qualifiers in 2014. On 17 May 2014 he started in the Azerbaijan Cup final match against Gabala and scored to put his side 1–0 up, which then Neftchi went on to win on penalties after 1–1. He also earned Man of the match award for his game.

On 9 February 2016, Masimov signed a three-year contract with Domžale. On 6 March 2016, Masimov made his debut for Domžale in a 1–1 home draw against Gorica, coming on as a substitute in the second half.

On 14 August 2018, Masimov signed a two-year contract with Keşla FK.

International career
Masimov made his Azerbaijan under-19 debut in 2013.
In May 2014, he was called up for Azerbaijan under-21.

Career statistics

Honours

Club
Neftchi Baku
 Azerbaijan Cup: (1) 2013–14

References

External links
 Профиль на Sports.ru 
 
 

1995 births
Living people
Azerbaijani footballers
Azerbaijan youth international footballers
Azerbaijan under-21 international footballers
Azerbaijani expatriate footballers
Association football wingers
Neftçi PFK players
NK Domžale players
AZAL PFK players
FC Fakel Voronezh players
Shamakhi FK players
FC Lokomotiv Moscow players
FC Olimp-Dolgoprudny players
FC Khimki players
Azerbaijan Premier League players
Slovenian PrvaLiga players
Expatriate footballers in Slovenia
Expatriate footballers in Russia
Azerbaijani expatriate sportspeople in Russia